Sliding Doors is a 1998 romantic comedy-drama film written and directed by Peter Howitt and starring Gwyneth Paltrow while also featuring John Hannah, John Lynch, and Jeanne Tripplehorn. The film alternates between two storylines, showing two paths the central character's life could take depending on whether she catches a train. It has drawn numerous comparisons to Polish director Krzysztof Kieślowski's 1987 film Blind Chance, the outcome of which also hinges on whether the protagonist catches a train.

Plot 
Helen Quilley gets fired from her public relations job. As she leaves the office building, she drops an earring in the lift, and a man picks it up for her. She rushes for her train on the London Underground but misses it as the train doors are closed; but the film then rewinds, and the scene is replayed, except that now she manages to board the train. The film continues, alternating between the two storylines in which different events ensue (but with occasional intersections of the two).

In the storyline in which she boards the train, Helen sits alongside James (the man in the lift) on the Underground, and they strike up a conversation. She gets home to catch her boyfriend, Gerry, in bed with his American ex-girlfriend, Lydia. Helen leaves him and moves in with her friend Anna, and, at Anna's suggestion, she changes her hairstyle to make a fresh start.

James continues to serendipitously pop into Helen's life, cheering her up and encouraging her to start her own public relations firm. She and James fall in love despite her reservations about beginning another relationship so soon after her ugly breakup with Gerry. Eventually, Helen discovers that she is pregnant. Believing it is James's child, she goes to see him at his office. She is stunned to learn from James's secretary that he is married. James finds her on a bridge and explains that he was married but is now separated and planning a divorce, but he and his wife maintain the appearance of a happy marriage for the sake of his sick mother. After she and James declare their love, Helen walks into the road and is hit by a van.

In the storyline in which Helen misses the train, subsequent services are delayed, so she exits the station and hails a taxi. A man tries to snatch her handbag and injures her, so she goes to the hospital. She arrives home after Lydia has left, and she remains oblivious to Gerry's infidelity. Unable to find another PR job, she takes two part-time jobs to pay the bills. Gerry continues to juggle the two women in his life. Lydia, wanting Gerry for herself, resorts to dropping clues to Helen of their affair. Helen suspects Gerry of infidelity but later discovers that she is pregnant. She receives a phone call, allegedly, for a job interview with an international PR firm. She tells Gerry the news but does not manage to tell him of her pregnancy. Lydia calls Gerry to her apartment, apparently to break up. Thinking Helen is at her interview, Gerry goes to see Lydia. While at Lydia's, Gerry answers the doorbell and sees Helen standing at the door, her interview being with Lydia, having arranged both meetings for the same time to expose their affair. Helen is stunned to see Gerry, and Lydia drops the news of her own pregnancy to both. Distraught, Helen runs off and falls down the stairs.

In both storylines, Helen is taken to the hospital and loses her baby.

In the storyline where she originally boarded the train and met her new-found love, James, she dies in his arms, right after he says he will make her very happy.

Where Helen missed the train, she recovers and tells Gerry to leave for good. Then, as Helen enters the lift to leave the hospital after recovering, she drops an earring. As in their brief encounter at the beginning of the film, James picks up the earring and gives it to her, and then he begins the same cheer-up joke as when they first met in the other storyline. But this time, Helen correctly quotes the punch line, and they turn and look at each other.

Cast

Production 
In this film, the explicit dual timelines are similar to a less emphasized split storyline in the 1949 film dealing with a train crash, The Interrupted Journey.

Principal photography commenced on April 1, 1997, and concluded on May 28, 1997.

The scenes on the London Underground were filmed at Waterloo tube station and Bank station on the Waterloo & City line and at Fulham Broadway tube station on the District line. Helen's flat is in Leinster Square. The American Diner is Fatboy's Diner whilst situated at Old Spitalfields Market. The scenes by the Thames were filmed next to Hammersmith Bridge and in the Blue Anchor pub in Hammersmith. The bridge featured is the Albert Bridge between Battersea and Chelsea. The late-night scene when Paltrow and Hannah walk down the street was filmed in Primrose Gardens (formerly Stanley Gardens) in Belsize Park. The final hospital scene where Helen and James meet in the lift was filmed at Chelsea and Westminster Hospital on Fulham Road.

Soundtrack 

 Blair – "Have Fun, Go Mad"
 Space Monkeys – "Drug Soup"
 Aqua – "Turn Back Time"
 Dodgy – "Good Enough"
 Dido – "Thank You"
 Jamiroquai – "Use the Force"
 Olive – "Miracle"
 Peach Union – "On My Own"
 Aimee Mann – "Amateur"
 Elton John – "Honky Cat"
 Abra Moore – "Don't Feel Like Cryin'"
 Those Magnificent Men – "Call Me a Fool."
 The Brand New Heavies – "More Love"

British singer Dido's song "Thank You", which appeared on the soundtrack, became a hit two years later. A commercial for this film featuring "Thank You" as background music inspired rapper Eminem to use Dido's voice for his song, "Stan". The song eventually hit No. 3 on the Billboard Hot 100 chart.

Aqua's song "Turn Back Time" was released as a single in 1998 and topped the UK Singles Chart. The music video is heavily based on the film and featured scenes from it.

The Patty Larkin cover of "Tenderness on the Block" that plays during the final scene was never released due to copyright and recording issues.

Reception

Box office 
The film opened at number 17 at the US box office with $834,817 during its first weekend but increased by 96.5% to $1,640,438 on its second weekend. It ended up with a total gross of $11,841,544 in the United States and Canada. It also saw success in the United Kingdom and was the highest-grossing local production for the year with a total box office gross in excess of £12 million. The film's total worldwide takings totaled over $67 million.

Critical response 
Rotten Tomatoes gives the film a 65% approval rating based on 54 reviews, with an average rating of 6.3/10. The critics consensus reads, "Despite the gimmicky feel of the split narratives, the movie is watchable due to the winning performances by the cast." Metacritic gives the film a score of 59 out of 100 based on 23 reviews, indicating the reaction as "mixed or average."

Time Out described the film as "essentially a romantic comedy with a nifty gimmick".
Angie Errigo of Empire gave the film 3/5 stars. Roger Ebert gave it 2/4 stars, and was critical of the screenplay.

In popular culture 
The thirteenth episode of season eight of Frasier, "Sliding Frasiers", is inspired by the film. In it, Frasier struggles deciding whether to wear a suit or a sweater to an upcoming Valentine's Day speed-dating event. The aftereffects of either decision are explored, although the episode ends identically with both timelines intersecting as Frasier, having failed to get a date, drives to a caller's workplace to woo her.

The Broad City season 4 episode "Sliding Doors" shows the origin story of Abbi and Ilana's friendship cut between two timelines. In both scenarios, they meet at a NYC subway station. From there, one story involves them boarding a subway train and going through the day separately. In the other, they miss their train and they spend the day together.

The Unbreakable Kimmy Schmidt season 4 episode "Sliding Van Doors" centers on the film, showing an alternate timeline where Kimmy Schmidt does not get in her kidnapper's van in 1998 because she does not want to miss a screening of Sliding Doors.

Other shows to use a premise similar to Sliding Doors, but without directly referencing the film, include Malcolm in the Middle, Mad About You, and Community.

See also 
 Time loop
 Sliding doors moment
 Run Lola Run, another 1998 film similar to Blind Chance

Further reading 
  (screenplay)

References

External links 
 
 
 
 
 
 

1998 films
1990s fantasy comedy-drama films
1998 romantic comedy-drama films
1990s romantic fantasy films
1998 directorial debut films
1998 independent films
Alternate timeline films
American fantasy comedy-drama films
American romantic comedy-drama films
American romantic fantasy films
British fantasy comedy-drama films
British romantic comedy-drama films
British romantic fantasy films
Films about multiple time paths
Films directed by Peter Howitt
Films produced by Sydney Pollack
Films scored by David Hirschfelder
Films set on the London Underground
Films shot at Shepperton Studios
Films shot in Buckinghamshire
Films shot in London
Miramax films
Paramount Pictures films
1990s English-language films
1990s American films
1990s British films